Robert Benjamin Smith (born December 3, 1962) is a former American football defensive end in the National Football League (NFL) for the Minnesota Vikings and Dallas Cowboys. He also was a member of the Arizona Wranglers, Toronto Argonauts, Tampa Bay Storm and Detroit Drive. He played college football at Grambling State University.

Early years
Born in Bogalusa, Louisiana, he attended Bogalusa High School. He accepted a football scholarship from Grambling State University.

Professional career
Smith was selected by the New Orleans Breakers in the 1984 USFL Territorial Draft. He was traded and signed to play for the Arizona Wranglers in the United States Football League for the 1984 season. He was also selected by the Minnesota Vikings in the second round (40th overall) of the 1984 NFL Supplemental Draft. 

In 1985, he joined the Vikings after the USFL folded, playing in all 16 games as a backup at defensive end and defensive tackle, though he was almost exclusively used as a field goal blocker due to his 6'6 frame. He was released before the start of the 1986 season.

In 1987, he was signed as a free agent by the Dallas Cowboys. He broke his left arm during the preseason and was placed on the injured reserve list. He was released before the start of the 1988 season.

References

External links
Just Sports Stats

1962 births
Living people
People from Bogalusa, Louisiana
Players of American football from Louisiana
American football defensive ends
Canadian football defensive linemen
American players of Canadian football
Arizona Wranglers players
Minnesota Vikings players
Dallas Cowboys players
Toronto Argonauts players
Tampa Bay Storm players
Detroit Drive players